Kingdom's Swords is the seventh novel of the military science fiction StarFist Saga by American writers David Sherman and Dan Cragg.

Overview
In the previous book, Hangfire, it was related that the Skinks (an alien race thus far mostly unknown to the Human Confederation) have invaded the planet Kingdom. The planetary government reluctantly requests Confederation assistance, but thanks to miscommunications and pure bureaucratic bungling, the Marines of 34th FIST are deployed thinking that they are on their way to put down a peasant rebellion. Kingdom's government are very religious and make it harder for the 34th FIST to fight the Skinks. Kingdom's army is poorly equipped and poorly trained to fight the Skinks. So the Skinks catch the 34th FIST by surprise. Only one platoon of the unit has encountered the Skinks before, in Blood Contact, and had been forbidden to talk about their experiences, or even reveal the existence of these aliens. Even worse than this surprise is a new devastating weapon in use by the Skinks. The Rail Gun, a weapon that makes it impractical for the Marines to use aircraft or armored vehicles in close combat. To make matters worse for Company L, their commander is unexpectedly summoned back to Earth.

In this book, the casualty rate is very high for the 34th, even worse than they had experienced in Steel Gauntlet.  Sherman and Cragg have been very careful so far in the series not to kill off important characters, but break this rule in Kingdom's Swords.

American science fiction novels
2002 science fiction novels
StarFist series
2002 American novels
Del Rey books